Judy Wills Cline (born 1948) is a retired American trampoline gymnast and acrobat. Between 1964 and 1968 she won ten world titles in the trampoline, synchronized trampoline, and tumbling. She was the first world champion in these events and the only athlete to win the world championships in both trampoline and tumbling. She is listed in the Guinness Book of Records for winning most world individual titles in trampoline (5); and for performing most bounding whips (26), bounding fulls (16) and bounding double-fulls (8), all accomplished on a firm floor. She won 38 national titles in the trampoline, tumbling, vault, and floor exercise. In 1993 she was inducted to the U.S. Gymnastics Hall of Fame.

After retirement from competitions she was head coach of the U.S. trampoline and tumbling teams at several world championships and world cups. Between 1998 and 2000 she acted as National Coaching Coordinator for the Trampoline and Tumbling Program. She worked as a coach in Las Vegas for at least 27 years. She is married to Jerry Cline. They have a son Michael, a gymnast studying at the United States Air Force Academy.

References

1948 births
Living people
American female trampolinists
Medalists at the Trampoline Gymnastics World Championships
20th-century American women